Sérgio Vieira Chapelin (Valença, Rio de Janeiro, May 12, 1941) is a Brazilian journalist, reporter, announcer and television presenter.

Biography

Sérgio began his career as a radio announcer, including Rádio Nacional, Rádio MEC and Rádio Jornal do Brasil. He made his debut at TV Globo in 1972 as an anchor of Jornal Hoje replacing Ronaldo Rosas, and in the same year he anchored Jornal Nacional alongside Cid Moreira.

In 1983, Sérgio left TV Globo to present the Show without Limit, at SBT, but the experience did not work out, as the then president of Globo Organizations Roberto Marinho boycotted in his broadcaster the advertisements in which Sérgio presented - such advertisements were the main ones. Sergio's income sources, and thus Sérgio soon returned to TV Globo in 1984 to anchor the Jornal Nacional again from 1989 and as the exclusive anchor of Fantástico until 1992.

Sérgio also became the first host of Globo Repórter.

On September 27th 2019, Chapelin retired from broadcasting, being replaced by Sandra Annenberg at the presentation of Globo Repórter.

Personal life

Currently, Sergio resides on a farm in Itanhandu, Minas Gerais, and traveled weekly to the Central Globo de Jornalismo located in the Jardim Botânico neighborhood of Rio de Janeiro while performing live - since 2010, alongside fellow journalist and presenter Glória Maria - Globo news reporter.

Works

Jornal Nacional (1969) 
Fantástico (1973) 
Isto É Pelé (1975)
Samba da Criação do Mundo (1978) 
Nas Ondas do Surf (1978) 
Copa 78 - O Poder do Futebol (1979) 
Show sem Limite (1983-1984)
Uma Canção Brasileira (1986)
Fantástico 30 Anos - Grandes Reportagens (2004)
Globo Repórter (1973 - 1983, 1986 - 1989 and 1996 - 2019)

See also

Cid Moreira
Globo Repórter
Rede Globo

References

External links

 Sérgio Chapelin in Twitter
 Globo Repórter

1941 births
Brazilian television presenters
Living people